1960 in Korea may refer to:
1960 in North Korea
1960 in South Korea